Stanford Blade is a Canadian agronomist and academic administrator. He is the dean of the faculty of Agricultural, Life and Environmental Sciences (ALES) at the University of Alberta. Blade is a fellow of the Royal Swedish Academy of Agriculture and Forestry.

Early life and education 
Blade was born in Alberta where he was raised on a dairy and grain farm.  He attended the University of Alberta for his first degree (B.Sc.) in genetics.  He obtained his M.Sc. (Crop Science) from the University of Saskatchewan for a breeding/physiology study on wheat.  Blade’s doctorate was awarded by McGill University in Montreal for work done at the International Institute of Tropical Agriculture on a Canadian International Development Agency Ph.D. Scholarship.  The thesis topic was a plant breeding/farming systems approach to improving an indigenous grain legume (Vigna unguiculata L.) for use within the complex cereal-legume cropping systems of the West African savanna.

Career 
Blade was the executive director (2006–2009) of the Alberta Agricultural Research Institute. He was previously employed as the deputy director general research for the International Institute of Tropical Agriculture (IITA). Blade is a Trustee on the Board of the International Institute of Tropical Agriculture and previously served as vice-chair on the board of the African Agricultural Technology Foundation.

Blade’s research has included the development and release of the high-performing Cutlass field pea. Blade has participated in the release of several field pea, lentil, cowpea and fenugreek lines. Blade is an associate editor for the Agronomy Journal.

Awards and honors 
In 2012, Blade was named one of Alberta's 50 most influential people by Alberta Venture magazine. In 2018, Blade was elected as an International Fellow of the Royal Swedish Academy of Agriculture and Forestry.

References

External links
 
 

Year of birth missing (living people)
Living people
People from Wetaskiwin
Canadian agronomists
Members of the Royal Swedish Academy of Agriculture and Forestry
Canadian biologists
21st-century Canadian biologists
Academic staff of the University of Alberta
Canadian university and college faculty deans